The 1993 South Australian National Football League (SANFL) Grand Final saw the Woodville-West Torrens defeating Norwood by 73 points. The match was played on Saturday 2 October 1993 at Football Park in front of a crowd of 42,719.

This was Woodville-West Torrens first grand final appearance, and their first premiership. This was the also the first premiership for West Torrens since 1953, and the first premiership for Woodville after 29 years in the SANFL competition.

References 

SANFL Grand Finals
Sanfl Grand Final, 1993